Murray-Wellington is an electoral district of the Legislative Assembly in the Australian state of Western Australia. The seat's current member is Labor MLA Robyn Clarke.

Originally known as Murray, it was one of the original 30 seats contested at the 1890 election. The district is a regional electorate situated between Mandurah and Bunbury. The seat has alternated between the names Murray and Murray-Wellington to reflect its geography.

The seat has been a traditional stronghold for the Liberal Party, though the opposing Labor Party has won the seat three times in the last four decades.

Geography
In its present configuration, Murray-Wellington is a coastal electorate running from the eastern outskirts of Mandurah to the northern outskirts of Bunbury. It covers three local government areas – Shire of Murray, Shire of Waroona and the Shire of Harvey – including all of the latter two and the vast geographic majority of the former. Its major population centres include the towns of Dwellingup, Harvey, North Dandalup, North Yunderup, Pinjarra, South Yunderup and Waroona as well as the northern Bunbury suburbs of Australind and Leschenault.

History
The seat of Murray-Wellington (or Murray) has traditionally been a stronghold of the Liberal Party and its predecessor parties, but became a marginal seat held by Labor following the 2017 state election. The district's most famous member was Ross McLarty, Premier of Western Australia between 1947 and 1953, who held the seat from 1930 to 1962.

The seat's current Labor member, Robyn Clarke, arrived as a result of the 2017 state election. The seat's only other Labor member, Keith Read, won the vacant seat at the 1989 state election, even as his father and then Labor MP John Read was defeated in the neighbouring seat of Mandurah. Keith Read was defeated at the 1993 state election.

Members for Murray-Wellington

Election results

References

External links
 ABC election profiles: 2005 2008
 WAEC district maps: current boundaries, previous distributions

Electoral districts of Western Australia